Hussein Refki Pasha Ahmed Hafez Mohammed Hafez (1876–1950) was an Egyptian military general and politician who served as Egypt's 25th Minister of War and Marine.

Career

Hussein Refki Pasha served as Egypt's Minister of War and Marine from December 1937 to April 1938, during the early reign of King Farouk of Egypt. Refki later became a senator in the Egyptian Senate (Majlis-al-Shuyukh), the upper-house of the Egyptian Parliament (dissolved in 1956). Prior to his political career, Refki served in the royal court as Chief Aide-de-Camp (Kebeer-al-Yawaran) to kings Fuad I and Farouk. As Chief Aide-de-Camp, Refki commanded the King's Military Household (predecessor to the  Republican Guard of Egypt), which included the royal guard and other elite military formations. A street is named for Refki in the Sarayat El-Quba neighbourhood of Heliopolis, Cairo.

Family

Hussein Refki Pasha was born in Cairo, Egypt, to an aristocratic Turco-Egyptian family of statesmen and military officers. Refki's grandfather, Mehmet Hafiz Pasha, was an Ottoman military commander who served as Serasker of the army, as Wali (governor) of Bosnia, Diyarbekir Eyalet, Sivas Eyalet, Erzurum Eyalet, Konya, Ionnina, Skopje, Erdine, and Mosul, and as Sheikh Al-Haram (civil governor) of Medina. Refki's father, Ahmed Hafez Bey, and Refki's brother, Hassan Hafez Pasha, both served as career officers in the Egyptian Army.

Refki’s family has also produced several eminent Egyptian judges. Refki's only child, Chancellor Hafez Refky, was a member of Egypt's Supreme Judicial Council (Majlis al-Qada' al-A'la), and Vice-President of Egypt's Court of Cassation (Mahkamat-al-Naqd), Egypt's highest appellate court. Refki's nephew, Chancellor Fouad Hafez, was President of the Egyptian Court of Appeals in Cairo (Mahkamat Isti'naf al-Qahirah).

Hussein Refki Pasha is related to the Muhammad Ali dynasty of Egypt through his mother, who is directly descended from the dynasty's founder, Muhammad Ali of Egypt. Since the 1930s Refki and his patrilineal descendants have used the surname "Refky" or "Refki."

Awards and honours

 Grand Cordon Order of Ismail
 Grand Cordon Order of the Nile
 Knight Grand Cross Order of the Crown of Italy
 Knight Grand Cross Order of the Star of Ethiopia
 Honour Medal of Syrian Merit, First Class 
 Honour Medal of Lebanese Merit, First Class 
 Grand Officer Order of Leopold II
  Chief ADC to King Fuad I of Egypt 
  Chief ADC to King Farouk of Egypt

References

Egyptian military personnel
Egyptian nobility
1876 births
1950 deaths
Pashas
Egyptian generals
Egyptian people of Turkish descent
Egyptian pashas
19th-century Egyptian people
Defence Ministers of Egypt
Recipients of orders, decorations, and medals of Ethiopia